The Benelli 254, originally known as the Benelli 250 Quatro, is a  inline four motorcycle produced by the Italian manufacturer Benelli from 1977 to 1984. It was at the time the smallest production four. The model was also badge engineered as the Moto Guzzi 254.

Model history
With the backing of the Italian Government agency Gepi, Italian-Argentine industrialist Alejandro de Tomaso purchased Benelli and Moto Guzzi in 1972. He set about introducing a range of new models, including one to take advantage of the tax concessions on machines under 250 cc in Italy and other markets.

The bike was designed by engineer Lino Tonti and although a four, was a different design the larger 500/4. Styling was by Paolo Martin. The 250 Quatro was First shown at the 1975 Milan Motorcycle Show, and production started in 1977.

Martin's sleek styling included uncluttered handlebars, with the clocks and brake master cylinder mounted in the tank. The British Moto Guzzi importers declined to import the model because of the range.

The Benelli version was aimed a more sports market whereas the Moto Guzzi was intended to be more touring oriented. The two brands used different tanks and seat humps. On the Benelli 3 spoke cast wheels were fitted and 6 spoke on the Guzzi. The machine were expensive compared to its rivals and sales were slow. The Guzzi version stopped production in 1981, although was still available in showrooms for a few years. Less than 1,000 of the Guzzi version were produced. The Benelli variant stopped production in 1984.

Benelli 304

A re-styled version, the Benelli 304, was introduced in 1983. Production ended in 1986, but stocks of the machines were being sold until the early '90s.

Technical details
The transverse four engine was compact and light, weighing only  not including its four  Dell'Orto carburettors. A chain was used to drive the SOHC.

A 5 speed gearbox was fitted and drive to the rear wheel was by chain.

The model had a single downtube frame, suspension was by telescopic forks and swinging arm. A Grimeca front disc was fitted and the rear brake was a drum.

References

Bibliography

External links

 
 
 

254
Motorcycles introduced in 1977
Standard motorcycles